Perfect Symmetry is the fifth studio album by progressive metal band Fates Warning, released in 1989 through Metal Blade Records; a remastered edition was reissued on June 10, 2008 together with a bonus disc containing studio demos, as well as a DVD of live performances from the 1989–90 Perfect Symmetry world tour. It was with this album that the band's more modern, progressive direction was established.

Overview
Perfect Symmetry was Fates Warning's second album with singer Ray Alder, who fully participated in the writing of the album. Guitarist and founding band member Jim Matheos describes Alder as having "really started to find his voice and range [on Perfect Symmetry]. It was our second album with him and he did some incredible stuff. It's also when he started to sing in a lower range and we welcomed that because that's the direction we wanted to head into anyway. Before that album, in terms of singing, we were like, 'the higher the better!'"

It was also the band's first album with drummer Mark Zonder, who, according to Matheos, "helped us go in that progressive direction we wanted to go in. It was an even bigger change than when Ray joined a few years before." Zonder confirmed in a 2011 interview that Matheos was pushing the songwriting in a more progressive direction: "It seemed a bit more prog and less thrashy. Seemed like Jim wanted to stretch things out a bit and make them a bit more airy-linear than straight up and down."

"Nothing Left to Say" was featured on the soundtrack to the 1991 film Freddy's Dead: The Final Nightmare. An instrumental version of "At Fates Hands", renamed "At Fate's Fingers", was released on the 1991 compilation album Guitar's Practicing Musicians Vol. 2, and resurfaced four years later on Fates Warning's only compilation album Chasing Time.

Reception

Critical reception for Perfect Symmetry has been mostly positive. Robert Taylor at AllMusic gave the album four out of five stars and said, "This was the recording that established Fates Warning as a progressive band. Their metal influences still dominate the group's overall sound; however, Mark Zonder's unique approach to drumming adds another level of depth and credibility to the music." Trey Spencer at Sputnikmusic gave the album five stars out of five, describing it as "easily their most progressive album to date" and saying, "If you like your prog cold and precise without all the random instrumental masturbation that a lot of others utilize then you should do your best to pick this up as soon as possible."

The album was relatively successful in the charts, reaching No. 141 on the U.S. Billboard 200 (the second-highest position in the band's history) and remaining on that chart for nine weeks. Fates Warning would not have another album enter the Billboard 200 until Darkness in a Different Light in 2013.

Track listing

Disc two (CD)

Disc three (DVD)

Chart performance

Personnel
Ray Alder – lead vocals, background vocals
Jim Matheos – guitar
Frank Aresti – guitar, background vocals
Kevin Moore – keyboard
Mark Zonder – drums
Joe DiBiase – bass
Faith Fraeoli – violin
Phil Magnotti – engineering, mixing
Matt Lane – engineering
Johnny Montagnese – engineering
Max Norman – mixing, executive production
Bob Ludwig – mastering
Roger Probert – production

References

Fates Warning albums
1989 albums
Metal Blade Records albums